Łodwigowo  (also referred to as Ludwikowice) is a village in the administrative district of Gmina Grunwald, within Ostróda County, Warmian-Masurian Voivodeship, in northern Poland. It is located in the historic region of Masuria. The village has a population of 420.

History
The village surely existed in the 14th century. It is close to the site of the Battle of Grunwald (1410), which is commemorated by a museum and memorial site. It was devastated during the Polish-Teutonic wars, and then refounded by Polish people.

References

Villages in Ostróda County